Somatidia tricolor is a species of beetle in the family Cerambycidae. It was described by Lea in 1929. It is known from Australia.

References

tricolor
Beetles described in 1929